Arline is a given name. Notable people with the name include:

Mollie Arline Kirkland Bailey (1844–1918), circus musician, singer, war-time nurse, and according to some accounts, a spy
Arline Fisch, American artist and educator who works with metal as her medium
Arline Friscia (1934–2019), American politician who served in the New Jersey General Assembly
Arline Burks Gant, director, actress and costume designer
Arline Hunter (1931–2018), American actress and model
Arline Judge (1912–1974), American actress
Arline Francis Kazanjian (1907–2001), American actress, radio talk show host, and game show panellist

See also
SS Lake Arline, a commercial cargo ship acquired by the U.S. Navy during World War II
Airline
Aline (disambiguation)
Arlie
Carline

Feminine given names